Latha may refer to:

People

First name
Latha Mangipudi, American politician
Latha Kurien Rajeev (born 1965), Indian film producer
Latha Rajinikanth (born 1958), Indian film producer
Latha Raju (born 1953), Indian actress and singer
Latha Sethupathi (born 1953), Indian actress, known mononymously as Latha
Latha Walpola (born 1934), Sri Lankan musician

Surname
Maadhavi Latha (born 1988), Indian actress
Paul Boundoukou-Latha (born 1952), Gabonese politician and diplomat

Other uses
Latha Math, a song by Mànran
Latha Township, Burma

See also

Lata (disambiguation)

Hindu given names
Indian feminine given names
Sanskrit-language names
Indian given names
Telugu names
Telugu given names